is a former Japanese football player.

Club statistics

References

External links

1982 births
Living people
Momoyama Gakuin University alumni
Association football people from Okayama Prefecture
Japanese footballers
J1 League players
J2 League players
Japan Football League players
Cerezo Osaka players
Kataller Toyama players
SP Kyoto FC players
Association football defenders
Universiade medalists in football
Universiade gold medalists for Japan